William Howard Dillman (born May 25, 1945) is a retired American professional baseball player. A right-handed pitcher, he appeared in 50 Major League games over two seasons for the 1967 Baltimore Orioles and the 1970 Montreal Expos.

Taken by the Orioles in the 6th round of the 1965 amateur draft, Dillman made his Major League debut for the Orioles in 1967. He pitched five innings of no-hit baseball in relief of starting pitcher Tom Phoebus. He struck out veteran Phil Roof and held off all-star Bert Campaneris to win the game in his first appearance.

Dillman finished 16 games in his career and amassed 3 saves.

References

External links

1945 births
Living people
Baseball players from New Jersey
American expatriate baseball players in Canada
Major League Baseball pitchers
Baltimore Orioles players
Buffalo Bisons (minor league) players
Montreal Expos players
Wake Forest University alumni
Elmira Pioneers players
Rochester Red Wings players
Sportspeople from Mercer County, New Jersey
Winnipeg Whips players
Tulsa Oilers (baseball) players
Tidewater Tides players